Elsa is a female given name mostly used in the Scandinavian countries.

Provenance
Originally Elsa was simply a short form for the biblical name Elisabeth and some of its variants: Elisabet, Elisabetta and Elizabeth.

The first record mentioning the name were in Sweden at the 15th century, and became generally used after the 19th century.

Variants

Eli
Elis
Elise
Eliza
Ella
Elle
Else
Elsie
Elys
Elza
Ilsa
Ilse
Els

Statistics 

After the release of Disney's Frozen at the end of 2013, in which a main character is named Elsa, the name became more popular in different countries across the world. In the Faroe Islands and Sweden the name was in the top 10 baby names before the film was released, and became the most popular name afterwards, in 2014 and 2015.

People
Elsa Benítez (born 1977), Mexican model
Elsa Borg (1826–1909), Swedish social worker
Elsa Brändström (1888–1948), Swedish philanthropist
Elsa Beata Bunge (1734–1819), Swedish botanist
Elsa Patricia Galarza Contreras (born 1963), Peruvian economist
Elsa Ehrich (1914–1948), German Nazi SS concentration camp guard executed for war crimes
Elsa Einstein (1876–1936), German, Albert Einstein's second wife
Elsa Eschelsson (1861–1911), first Swedish woman doctor in law
Elsa Fougt (1744–1826), Swedish publisher
Elsa von Freytag-Loringhoven (1874–1927), German artist/poet
Duchess Elsa of Württemberg (1876–1936)
Elsa Gye (1881–1943), suffragette
Elsa Hosk (born 1988), Swedish model
Elsa Kazi (1884–1967), German writer and German origin Sindhi woman. Famous for her poem The Neem Tree.
Elsa Klensch (1930–2022), Australian-American Fashion Commentator
Elsa Lanchester (1902–1986), English-American actress, probably best known for playing the Bride of Frankenstein
Elsa Leviseur (born 1932), South African-born American architect.
Elsa Lindberg-Dovlette (1874–1944), Swedish writer and princess of Persia
Elsa Lunghini (born 1973), French singer
Elsa Majimbo (born 2001), Kenyan comedienne 
Elsa Martinelli (1935–2017), Italian actress and former fashion model
Elsa Maxwell (1883–1963), American gossip columnist and author, songwriter, and professional hostess
Elsa Morante (1912–1985), Italian novelist
Elsa Pataky (born 1976), Spanish actress, model, and film producer
Elsa Peretti (1940–2021), Italian jewelry designer
Elsa Ratassepp (1893–1972), Estonian actress
Elsa Raven (1929–2020), American actress
Elsa Salazar Cade (born 1952), American entomologist/educator
Elsa Schiaparelli (1890–1973), Italian fashion designer of the 1920s and 1930s
Elsa Maria Sylvestersson (1924–1996), Finnish ballet dancer and choreographer
Elsa Triolet (1896–1970), French writer
Elsa Zylberstein (born 1968), French actress

Fictional characters
Elsa (Frozen), from Disney's animated film Frozen
Elsa (Once Upon a Time), from the ABC television series Once Upon a Time
Elsa (Symphogear), a character in the anime series Symphogear
Elsa Bloodstone, character from Marvel Comics
Elsa of Brabant, heroine of the Wagnerian opera Lohengrin
Baroness Elsa von Schraeder, from the film and stage show The Sound of Music 
Elsa Schneider, from Indiana Jones and the Last Crusade
Elsa Cleeg, of Kim Possible
Elsa Carrington, character from Secret Agent
Elsa von Frankenstein, wife of the titular Son of Frankenstein
Elsa Frankenstein, daughter of the brother of the Son of Frankenstein, appearing in both The Ghost of Frankenstein and Frankenstein Meets the Wolf Man
Elsa van Helsing, from Frankenweenie
Elsa Granhiert, character from Re:Zero − Starting Life in Another World
Elsa de Sica, from the manga/anime Gunslinger Girl
Elsa La Conti, from the video game series Arcana Heart
Elsa Lichtmann, from the L.A. Noire
Elsa Shivers from I Know What You Did Last Summer
Elsa Mars, of American Horror Story: Freak Show, portrayed by Jessica Lange
Elsa Tilsley, in the British soap opera Coronation Street
Exelsa, formerly Elsa, from the sitcom La familia P. Luche
Elsa, from Power Rangers Dino Thunder
Elsa, from Jojo Rabbit
Elsa Gardner, from Atypical
Elsa, from The Fundamentals of Caring
Elsa, one of the main characters in Armour of God II: Operation Condor

Other
Elsa the Lioness, subject of the book and film Born Free
Hurricane Elsa, a Category 1 Atlantic hurricane in 2021

References

External links
Wiktionary – Elsa
NamepediA Blog – The Real Elsa

Feminine given names
German feminine given names
Scandinavian feminine given names
Swedish feminine given names
Norwegian feminine given names
Icelandic feminine given names
Finnish feminine given names
Danish feminine given names
Estonian feminine given names

fr:Elza
pl:Elza